Reid Garrett Hoffman (born August 5, 1967) is an American internet entrepreneur, venture capitalist, podcaster, and author. Hoffman was the co-founder and executive chairman of LinkedIn, a business-oriented social network used primarily for professional networking. He is currently a partner at the venture capital firm Greylock Partners and a co-founder of Inflection AI.  On the Forbes 2021 list of the world's billionaires, Hoffman was ranked No. 1580 with a net worth of US $1.97 billion.

Early life and education
His paternal great-great-great-grandfather was Theophilus Adam Wylie, a Christian Presbyterian minister and Indiana University president pro tempore. Hoffman's uncle Eric Hoffman is a writer.

Hoffman described himself as an avid tabletop roleplaying gamer as a child. His first paid job (at age 12) was as an editor at the game company Chaosium, then based in Oakland near his home. Although he was only 14 years old at the time, Hoffman's name was featured on the box of Chaosium's RuneQuest role-playing game release Borderlands (1982), receiving equal billing with game designers Steve Perrin, Sandy Petersen and Greg Stafford.

Hoffman attended high school at The Putney School, where he farmed maple syrup, drove oxen, and studied epistemology. He graduated from Stanford University in 1990, where he won both a Marshall Scholarship and a Dinkelspiel Award, with a Bachelor of Science in Symbolic Systems and Cognitive Science. He went on to earn an Master of Studies in Philosophy from Wolfson College, Oxford in 1993 as a Marshall Scholar.

While in college, according to Hoffman, he formed a conviction that he wanted to try to influence the state of the world on a large scale. He saw academia as an opportunity to make an "impact." He later realized that the business world would provide him with a larger platform. "When I graduated from Stanford my plan was to become a professor and public intellectual. That is not about quoting Kant. It's about holding up a lens to society and asking 'who are we?' and 'who should we be, as individuals and a society?' But I realized academics write books that 50 or 60 people read and I wanted more impact."

Career

Early years
His first job was an internship at Inglenook, a winery in Napa Valley. He later joined Apple Computer in 1994, where he worked on eWorld, an early attempt at building an online service. AOL acquired eWorld in 1996. He later worked at Fujitsu before co-founding his first company – SocialNet.com in 1997. It focused "on online dating and matching up people with similar interests, like golfers who were looking for partners in their neighborhood." Peter Thiel has said SocialNet.com was "literally an idea before its time. It was a social network seven or eight years before that became a trend".

PayPal
While at SocialNet, Hoffman was a member of the board of directors during the founding of PayPal, an electronic money transmission service. In January 2000, he left SocialNet and joined PayPal full-time as the company's COO. Allen Blue, whom Hoffman hired at PayPal, said that "PayPal had to scratch and claw for every advantage it had, and Reid became an expert at competing effectively in an extremely competitive environment." Hoffman was responsible for all external relationships for PayPal, including payments infrastructure (Visa, Mastercard, ACH, Wells Fargo), business development (eBay, Intuit, and others), government (regulatory, judicial), and legal. Peter Thiel, Hoffman's boss at PayPal, has said that Hoffman "was the firefighter-in-chief at PayPal. Though that diminishes his role because there were many, many fires." At the time of PayPal's acquisition by eBay for $1.5 billion in 2002, he was executive vice president of PayPal.

LinkedIn

Hoffman co-founded LinkedIn in December 2002 with two former colleagues from SocialNet (including Allen Blue), from his time at Fujitsu. It launched on May 5, 2003, as one of the first business-oriented online social networks. Peter Thiel, a colleague of Hoffman's at PayPal, invested in LinkedIn. By November 2014, LinkedIn had over 332 million members in more than 200 countries and territories and now has nearly 800 million members. The site allows registered users to create professional profiles and connect with each other. Users can invite anyone (whether a site user or not) to become a connection. According to Forbes, "LinkedIn is, far and away, the most advantageous social networking tool available to job seekers and business professionals today."

Hoffman was LinkedIn's founding CEO for the first four years before becoming chairman and president of products in February 2007. He became executive chairman in June 2009. With the IPO of LinkedIn on May 19, 2011, Hoffman owns a stake worth an estimated $2.34 billion, not including any potential benefits from Greylock Partners, where he was named a partner in 2009. Hoffman believes that many people still do not know how to use its service and it is LinkedIn's job to help them out. In an interview, Hoffman said that "you have to think proactively about how to use a tool that enables your ability to move in ways that you weren't able to move before, and most of people are not very good at that".

Microsoft proposed to acquire LinkedIn on June 13, 2016, for $26.2 billion in cash. Hoffman became a Microsoft board member on March 14, 2017.

Artificial Intelligence ventures
Hoffman is one of the founding financial backers of the artificial intelligence research company OpenAI. 

In March 2022, it was announced that Hoffman was co-founding a new startup, Inflection AI, with his long-time friend and Greylock colleague, Mustafa Suleyman, the co-founder of DeepMind.  CNBC reported that "Headquartered in Silicon Valley, Inflection will aim to develop AI software products that make it easier for humans to communicate with computers."

On March 3, 2023, Hoffman resigned from his board seat at OpenAI, citing a desire to avoid conflicts of interest between his board seat at OpenAI, investments in AI technology companies via Greylock Partners, and role as founder of Inflection AI.

Investing
After the PayPal sale to eBay, Hoffman became one of Silicon Valley's most prolific and successful angel investors. According to venture capitalist David Sze, Hoffman "is arguably the most successful angel investor in the past decade." Dave Goldberg, former CEO of SurveyMonkey, said that Hoffman "is the person you want to talk to when you are starting a company." In 2010 Hoffman joined Greylock Partners and made his first, early investment in AirBNB. His areas of focus at Greylock include consumer and services, enterprise software, consumer Internet, enterprise 2.0, mobile, social gaming, online marketplaces, payments, and social networks.

According to David Kirkpatrick's book The Facebook Effect, Hoffman arranged the first meeting between Mark Zuckerberg and Peter Thiel, which led to Thiel's initial $500,000 angel investment in Facebook. Hoffman invested alongside Thiel in Facebook's first financing round.

Hoffman's current venture capital investments include Blockstream, Coda, Entrepreneur First, Neeva, Taptap Send and Helion Energy.

Past investments include 3DSolve, Airbnb, Coupons.com, Digg, Edmodo, Flickr, Gixo, IronPort, Knewton, Kongregate, Last.fm, Nanosolar, One Kings Lane, Permuto, Ping.fm, Shopkick, SixApart, thesixtyone, Swipely, Tagged, Technetto, TrialPay, Vendio, VigLink, Viki, Wikia, Wrapp, and Xapo. He served on Zynga's board of directors from March 2008 to June 2014 and currently serves on several public boards including Aurora, Joby Aviation and Microsoft.

Hoffman has made multiple investments in transportation technology companies, including Aurora (autonomous trucking), Convoy (trucking logistics marketplace), Nauto (AI software for driver safety), Nuro (autonomous delivery vehicles for goods) and Joby Aviation (electric, aerial ride-sharing), among others.

An early advocate for cryptocurrency, Hoffman led Greylock's 2014 Series A financing round in Xapo, a company that developed a bitcoin wallet product. Hoffman was also an early supporter of Celo, a cryptocurrency payments company.

Teaching
Hoffman teaches the free Stanford University class, "Blitzscaling".

Public intellectual work

Speaking

Hoffman has spoken at the XPrize Foundation's conference, the TED conference in Long Beach in 2012, and Fast Forward's Accelerate Good Global in 2020. He is a frequent lecturer at Stanford University, Oxford University, Harvard University, the MIT Media Lab, and others. He has appeared on The Charlie Rose Show, Fareed Zakaria's Global Public Square on CNN and other current affairs television programs.

In 2021, he appeared at TechCrunch Disrupt in September to talk about blitzscaling and Greylock's new $500 million seed fund, among other things, at the Bloomberg Equality Summit in October to talk about the important of diversity in tech and at the Knight Foundation Symposium Lessons from the First Internet Ages in November to discuss what we've learned from web 1.0 and 2.0.

The Start-Up of You
Hoffman is co-author, with Ben Casnocha, of the career book The Start-Up of You: Adapt to the Future, Invest in Yourself, and Transform your Career.

The book was released in the United States on February 14, 2012. It argues that individuals should think of themselves as businesses-of-one – the "CEO of their own career" – and draws many parallels between lessons learned from the stories of successful Silicon Valley technology companies and an individual's career.

Publishers Weekly reviewed the book positively, saying, "with plenty of valuable guidance relevant to any career stage, this book will help readers not only survive professionally in times of uncertainty but stand out from the pack and flourish." The Economist said that "Hoffman and Casnocha make a number of astute observations about shifts in the world of work."

As of September 2012 it had sold more than 100,000 copies. It became both a New York Times and Wall Street Journal bestseller.

The Alliance
Hoffman is co-author, with Ben Casnocha and Chris Yeh, of the management book The Alliance: Managing Talent in the Networked Age.

The book was released in the United States on July 8, 2014. It argues that previous career models of lifetime employment and free agency no longer work in a business world defined by continuous change. Instead, it proposes that employers and employees should think of each other as "allies" and move from a transactional approach to employment to a "relational" one. It proposes a new framework for managers and employers to organize their work, described as "tours of duty." Further, it argues why managers should encourage their employees to gather "network intelligence" and why companies and managers should maintain a lifelong relationship with former employees via a corporate alumni network.

The book became a New York Times bestseller. Arianna Huffington named The Alliance "the must-read book of the summer" in 2014.

Blitzscaling
Hoffman is co-author, with Chris Yeh, of the book Blitzscaling: The Lightning-Fast Path to Building Massively Valuable Companies. The book was released in the United States on October 9, 2018. It argues that the secret to starting and scaling massively valuable companies is “blitzscaling”, a set of techniques for “scaling up at a dizzying pace that blows competitors out of the water.”

Impromptu: Amplifying Our Humanity Through AI
On March 13, 2023, Hoffman released the book “Impromptu: Amplifying Our Humanity Through AI.” Hoffman claims to have written the book using the large language model GPT-4.

Podcasts 
On April 25, 2017, Reid Hoffman announced the launch of a business and finance podcast called Masters of Scale, with the first episode of the podcast launching on May 3, 2017. The podcast is hosted by Hoffman, and interviews guests who are notable entrepreneurs. Masters of Scale is committed to a 50-50 gender balance for its guests. In April 2018, Masters of Scale won the Webby People's Voice Award for Best Business Podcast.

In March of 2023, Hoffman and his Chief of Staff Aria Finger began hosting a podcast called "Possible". According to its creators, the podcast “sketches out the brightest version of the future—and what it will take to get there”. The first episode featured an interview with Trevor Noah.

Honors and awards
 In 2022, Reid delivered the commencement address at Vanderbilt University and received Vanderbilt's Nichols-Chancellor's Medal.
 In 2017 he was appointed an Honorary Commander of the Order of the British Empire (CBE), "For services to promoting UK business and social networking and the Marshall Scholarship scheme".
 In September 2014, the American Academy of Achievement awarded Hoffman with the annual Golden Plate award, which honors accomplished individuals "for significant achievement in their fields."
 In April 2014, President Barack Obama named Hoffman as a Presidential Ambassador for Global Entrepreneurship "to help develop the next generation of entrepreneurs."
 In April 2014, Hoffman received the Distinguished Citizen Award from the Commonwealth Club.
 In May 2012, Hoffman was ranked third on the Forbes Midas List of the top tech investors. Forbes described Hoffman as "Silicon Valley's uber-investor" and said Hoffman "has had a hand in creating nearly every lucrative social media startup."
 In 2012, The Martin Luther King Jr. Center honored Hoffman with their "Salute to Greatness" award which "recognizes individuals and corporations or organizations that exemplify excellence in leadership and a commitment to social responsibility in the spirit of Martin Luther King, Jr."
 In 2012, Newsweek and The Daily Beast released their first "Digital Power Index," a list of the 100 most significant people in the digital world that year (plus 10 additional "Lifetime Achievement" winners), and Hoffman was ranked No. 3 in the "Angels" category.
 In 2012, Hoffman, along with Salman Khan of Khan Academy, was honored by the World Affairs Council and Global Philanthropy Forum in 2012. The council recognizes and honors remarkable leaders who have effected and will continue to effect social change through their private enterprise and social action. The awards in 2012 were dedicated to celebrating Technology for Social Impact.
 Hoffman was awarded the 2012 David Packard Medal of Achievement Award by TechAmerica for his contributions and advances within the high-tech industry, his community, and humankind.
 Hoffman received an Honorary Doctor of Laws from Babson in 2012.
 In 2011, Hoffman and Jeff Weiner of LinkedIn shared the EY U.S. Entrepreneur of the Year Award.
 In 2010,  Hoffman was named No. 17 on Fast Companys list of the 100 Most Creative People in Business.

Personal life
In 2004, Hoffman married Michelle Yee. The couple resides in Seattle, Washington.

Philanthropy
Jeff Weiner, LinkedIn's CEO, has said that "Reid's true north is making a positive and lasting impact on the world, in a very profound way." Hoffman currently serves on the boards of Kiva.org (peer-peer microlending pioneer that allows people to lend money via the internet to low-income/underserved entrepreneurs and students), Endeavor Global (an organization that finds and supports high-impact entrepreneurs in emerging markets), and New America (a think tank that focuses on a range of public policy issues, including national security, technology, health, gender, education, and the economy). Hoffman also serves on the advisory council of the MIT Media Lab and is a supporter and chair of the advisory board for QuestBridge (a provider of talented low-income students to top colleges/universities). Hoffman was also the first major funder of Crisis Text Line, a free, 24/7 crisis service via SMS in the US.

In 2013, Hoffman provided a $250,000 matching grant to Code for America. In July 2016, Hoffman funded the $250,000 cash-prize MIT Media Lab MIT Disobedience Award, an award created by Hoffman and Joi Ito to honor and recognize acts of disobedience resulting in positive social impact. In November 2016, Hoffman and his wife, Michelle Yee, donated $20 million to the Chan Zuckerberg Initiative, a charity dedicated to eradicating disease by 2100. Hoffman and Yee's donation was for the Biohub, the Initiative's San Francisco laboratory. Hoffman also joined the board of the Biohub project. In May 2018, Hoffman and Yee joined the Giving Pledge, "a global effort to help address society’s most pressing problems by encouraging the wealthiest individuals and families to give the majority of their wealth to philanthropic causes."

Hoffman is also a long-time supporter of Second Harvest of Silicon Valley and in 2021, in response to the massive increased need due to the pandemic, offered to match any donations to the food bank, up to $2million

Artificial Intelligence 
Hoffman is one of the backers of the Ethics and Governance of Artificial Intelligence Fund, a joint venture between the MIT Media Lab and the Berkman Klein Centre for Internet and Society at Harvard University . He is on the board of the Stanford Institute for Human-Centered Artificial Intelligence (HAI), whose mission is to "advance AI research, education, policy and practice to improve the human condition", and launched the institute's Hoffman-Yee Research Grants to "fund interdisciplinary teams with research spanning HAI’s key areas of focus: understanding the human and societal impact of AI, augmenting human capabilities, and developing AI technologies inspired by human intelligence".  In 2018, Hoffman made a gift to the University of Toronto's Faculty of Information, to endow a chair "to study how the new era of artificial intelligence (AI) will affect our lives."

Diversity and Inclusion 
To increase diversity and inclusion in the start-up ecosystem Hoffman is a donor and advocate for HimforHer, which aims to accelerate diversity on corporate boards and All Raise, whose goal is to create a tech culture where women are leading, shaping, and funding the future. He’s also the founding donor and long-time board member at Opportunity@Work, an organization that seeks to eliminate the opportunity gap and provide millions of highly skilled but under-credentialed Americans (often from marginalized, rural and racially diverse backgrounds) better pathways to higher-paying jobs and careers.

Hoffman has argued for the abolishment of the death penalty on moral grounds, and because of racial biases and other instances of unequally applied justice. Hoffman has expressed his support for the writer, speaker, and criminal justice reform advocate Shaka Senghor.

Politics

Since 2011, Hoffman has been a member of the Bilderberg Group, which gathers 120150 North American and European "political leaders and experts from industry, finance, academia and the media" for an annual invitation-only closed-door conference. Since then he has attended every year with the exception of 2013. Hoffman is also listed as a member of the Council on Foreign Relations, to which he was elected in 2015.

In April 2013, a pro-immigration lobbying group called FWD.us was launched, with Reid Hoffman listed as one of the founders. In 2014, Hoffman donated $150,000 to the Mayday PAC. Also in 2014, Hoffman contributed $500,000 toward David Chiu's State Assembly campaign by funding an independent expenditure committee devoted to negative campaigning against his opponent: San Franciscans to Hold Campos Accountable—Vote No for Campos for State Assembly 2014.

In 2016, Hoffman contributed $220,000 in support of Democratic candidate for Vermont governor Matt Dunne, according to a mass-media disclosure filed at the Vermont Secretary of State's Office.

In 2016, Hoffman created a card game modeled after Cards Against Humanity intended to poke fun at US presidential candidate Donald Trump. In December 2018, the New York Times broke a story alleging that Hoffman had "put $100,000 into an experiment that adopted Russia-inspired political disinformation tactics on Facebook" during the 2017 special Senate race in Alabama, which allegedly targeted Roy Moore voters. Hoffman did not immediately respond. He apologized later that month, also stating he was unaware what the non-profit—Washington, D.C., based American Engagement Technologies, or AET—had been doing.

In 2018, Hoffman helped fund Alloy, a company founded to legally exchange data with affiliated Democrat groups like super PACs. Hoffman supplied half of the 35 million dollars to start it. The company shut down in 2021 after failing to live up to its promise.

Hoffman has been an outspoken proponent of democratic institutions and voting rights and in 2021 published a piece on LinkedIn entitled Protecting Voting Rights: Good for America, Good for American Business.  In this piece he discusses how "former American Express CEO Kenneth Chenault and Merck CEO Kenneth Frazier led corporate America to take an active role in this situation, by explicitly advocating for the rights of all American citizens to make their voices heard through the core democratic act of voting".  In 2020, Hoffman also penned a piece that argued for making Voting Day a holiday.

Hoffman gave at least $500,000 to the Mainstream Democrats super PAC, which was founded in February 2022 and has since spent more than $1 million supporting the campaigns of moderate Democrats Henry Cuellar and Kurt Schrader.

In October 2022, Hoffman joined the Defense Innovation Board, an independent advisory board for the United States Department of Defense.

References

External links 

 
 
 
 
 The Start-Up of You  book website
 The Alliance book website
 Blitzscaling book website
 Hoffman’s Personal Web Site

1967 births
Living people
Alumni of Wolfson College, Oxford
American billionaires
American chairpersons of corporations
American computer businesspeople
American technology company founders
American technology chief executives
American technology writers
American venture capitalists
Apple Inc. employees
Businesspeople from Berkeley, California
Fujitsu people
Honorary Commanders of the Order of the British Empire
IronPort people
PayPal people
Writers from Berkeley, California
People from Palo Alto, California
Stanford University alumni
Marshall Scholars
21st-century American businesspeople
The Putney School alumni
LinkedIn people
Henry Crown Fellows
Giving Pledgers
21st-century philanthropists
New America (organization)
Midas List
American expatriates in England